All I Wanna Do Is Swing (subtitled The Joe Newman Story) is an album by jazz trumpeter Joe Newman's Octet recorded in 1955 for the RCA Victor label.

Reception

Allmusic awarded the album 3 stars.

Track listing
 "Soon" (George Gershwin, Ira Gershwin) - 2:42
 "Limehouse Blues" (Philip Braham, Douglas Furber) - 3:25
 "Dream a Little Dream of Me" (Fabian Andre, Wilbur Schwandt, Gus Kahn) - 2:36
 "Corner Pocket" (Freddie Green) - 2:42
 "If I Could Be with You" (James P. Johnson, Henry Creamer) - 	3:07
 "It's a Thing of the Past" (Manny Albam) - 2:46
 "Pretty Skinny Bunny" (Ernie Wilkins) - 2:29
 "Leonice" (Joe Newman) - 3:36
 "Jack's Wax" (Al Cohn) - 2:31
 "Topsy" (Eddie Durham, Edgar Battle) - 3:17
 "Captain Spaulding" (Cohn) - 3:29
 "I Could Have Told You" (Carl Sigman, Jimmy Van Heusen) – 2:57
 "Lullaby of Birdland" (George Shearing, George David Weiss) - 3:09 Bonus track on CD reissue

Personnel 
Joe Newman- trumpet
Frank Rehak - trombone
Ernie Wilkins - alto saxophone
Al Cohn - tenor saxophone
Nat Pierce - piano
Freddie Green - guitar
Milt Hinton - bass
Shadow Wilson - drums
Manny Albam (tracks 1, 6, 8 & 13), Al Cohn (tracks 2, 5, 9 & 11), Ernie Wilkins (tracks 3, 4, 7, 10 & 12) - arranger

References 

1955 albums
RCA Records albums
Joe Newman (trumpeter) albums